Trinity Laure'Ale Home (born March 18, 1995), better known by her stage name Tink, is an American rapper and singer from the Chicago area in Illinois. She is best known for the single "Treat Me Like Somebody" and for the collaboration with singer and producer Jeremih on "Don't Tell Nobody". Since 2012, she has released seven mixtapes and has gone independent due to label issues regarding the release of her debut album. Her 2014 mixtape, Winter's Diary 2: Forever Yours, was featured as a top 10 R&B album in both Rolling Stone and Billboard magazines.

She was also chosen as part of the XXL 2015 Freshman Class.

Early life and education
Trinity Home was born on March 18, 1995, in Calumet City, Illinois. Home was nicknamed Tink by friends in elementary school and she has used the name ever since. Tink started singing in church when she was five years old and began writing songs at age 11, including some for her father's friends. She attended high school at Chicago's Simeon Career Academy where she participated in talent shows and joined the school choir. She counted English as one of her favorite subjects because it helped her become a stronger writer. She started rapping and recording music in her father's basement studio at the age of 15. At age 16, she and her brother posted a clip of her freestyling over Clipse's "Grindin'" to Facebook and received local buzz.

Career

2011–2014: Winter's Diary 2 and Timbaland 
Tink's career officially began with the release of her 2011's mixtape, Winter's Diary, while she was still in high school under Lyrical Eyes Management. In 2012, she followed that up with two more mixtape releases Alter Ego and Blunts & Ballads. In 2013, she released her fourth mixtape, Boss Up, and she was featured on Future Brown's debut single "Wanna Party". In 2013, the buzz surrounding her mixtape releases and her collaboration with Future Brown, which led her to have a meeting with record executives in Los Angeles. At the time, Tink noted that she was comfortable staying independent.

Tink's next mixtape, Winter's Diary 2: Forever Yours, which was named the eighth-best R&B album of 2014 by Rolling Stone and the ninth-best R&B album of 2014 by Billboard. In 2014, Tink performed alongside Sleigh Bells at South by Southwest (SXSW), and the acts released a joint single, "That Did It," on the same year. She also collaborated with Kelela on a song, titled "Want It" and collaborated with Jeremih on a song, titled "Don't Tell Nobody". In October 2014, Tink signed a deal with Timbaland's Mosley Music Group, an imprint of Epic Records. Tink appeared in the Worldstar Hip Hop documentary showcasing Chicago's burgeoning Hip Hop scene entitled "The Field: Chicago" in January 2014.

2014–2017: ThinkTink and label issues 
Her debut studio album had been scheduled to be released in 2015 and was preceded by the single "Ratchet Commandments". Timbaland made headlines in 2015 by indicating at SXSW that Aaliyah had appeared to him and described Tink as "the one." Tink would later perform an unreleased track that samples Aaliyah's "One in a Million". In April 2015, the unreleased track, now entitled "Million", was released.

Epic scheduled a July 2015 release for Think Tink but Timbaland decided to delay the project. "The album was actually finished. There was an intro, I had interludes." Tink told the FADER in February 2018. "It was [Timbaland's] call to hold back on it, and I think, I want to say, for the benefit of the doubt, he did want to perfect it. But it was Tim's call not to put it out." Frustrated by Mosley and Epic's resistance to letting her share new material with her fans, Tink returned to the formula that had initially earned her a loyal following, and released her third mixtape in the Winter's Diary series called Winter's Diary 3 which featured one of her most famous songs to date named "I Like".

In 2016, Tink released several tracks throughout the beginning of the year and dropped her seventh mixtape named Winter's Diary 4. The mixtape was mentioned on Rolling Stone's "40 Best Rap Albums of 2016" and ended up on number 20.

In 2017, Tink released few songs and had a six month long social media break, the reason for which would later become clear. In a February 2017 interview, Tink told DJ Vlad that she hadn't spoken to Timbaland in three months and said that the ball was still in his court when it came to releasing Think Tink. That spring, she began to seek a permanent solution that would get her out of her contract with Mosley, eventually reaching an agreement with the label at the end of the year with the rights to her unreleased music. Tink is now an independent artist. She does not have any interest in releasing any of her songs with Timbaland as she wants to start from scratch.

2018–present: Independence, Pain & Pleasure and Hopeless Romantic 
In January 2018, Tink's mixtape catalog appeared on all streaming services. After leaving Mosley Music Group and Epic Records, Tink released her first EP Pain & Pleasure in March 2018 through Machine Entertainment Group and Sony RED.

On April 28, 2019, Tink released the mixtape Voicemails, under Empire. The lead single was Bad Side.

Tink released the album Hopeless Romantic through Winter's Diary and Empire on February 14, 2020.

2021–present: Heat of the Moment 
Tink released the second album Heat of the Moment on July 30, 2021, which was executive produced by Hitmaka.

Musical style
Tink has been compared to Lauryn Hill, Ms. Jade and Da Brat. Her first mixtape, Winter's Diary, was largely filled with R&B ballads, but her second mixtape, Alter Ego, established her rapping skills. Her subsequent mixtapes have blended her R&B and rap styles. Tink has also been loosely associated with the Drill movement that was birthed in Chicago. Some of her early songs (like "Bad Girl") display some of the genre's hallmarks like aggressive beats and violent lyrics. She has since distanced herself from that movement, saying that she wants to become "a positive, realistic vision of female empowerment."

Much of the lyrical content in her music deals with complex emotional issues that are geared toward a primarily teenage demographic. She often uses a Chicago setting to convey her feelings about love, heartbreak, faithfulness, and teenage melodrama. Tink has been praised for her storytelling ability. Her music has also taken on issues like female empowerment and the Black Lives Matter movement.

Discography

Studio albums

Mixtapes

Extended plays

Singles

As lead artist

As featured artist

Guest appearances

References

External links
 Official website
 Tink on Twitter
 Tink on Facebook
 

1995 births
Living people
African-American women rappers
African-American women singer-songwriters
American rhythm and blues singer-songwriters
Rappers
American women rappers
People from Calumet City, Illinois
Rappers from Chicago
21st-century American rappers
21st-century women rappers
21st-century African-American women singers
Singer-songwriters from Illinois